Lahcen Maghfour (born 12 June 1950) is a Moroccan boxer. He competed in the men's featherweight event at the 1972 Summer Olympics. At the 1972 Summer Olympics, he lost to William Taylor of Great Britain.

References

1950 births
Living people
Moroccan male boxers
Olympic boxers of Morocco
Boxers at the 1972 Summer Olympics
Place of birth missing (living people)
Featherweight boxers